Chetin Sadula (born 16 June 1987) is a Bulgarian footballer of Turkish ethnicity who plays as a midfielder for Vitosha Bistritsa. He is a right midfielder who plays in the holding midfield role or as an attacking midfielder.

Career
A product of Bulgarian giants Levski Sofia's youth system, Sadula played only a one game for the side, serving consecutive loans in Rodopa Smolyan, Dunav Ruse, and Svilengrad 1921. He played his first and last match for Levski during the 2005–06 season on 31 May 2006 in a 1–2 away loss against Belasitsa Petrich, coming on as a substitute for Nikolay Dimitrov.

Kaliakra Kavarna
In June 2008, his contract was mutually terminated and Sadula joined Kaliakra Kavarna. At Kaliakra, he became a regular starter of the team, as a right side midfielder and a right winger. Sadula made his Kaliakra début on 10 August 2008 in the home game versus Chernomorets Balchik. He scored his first goal for the team in the match against Svilengrad 1921 on 20 September 2008. His second season with Kaliakra has been a much improved one. In 2009–10, Sadula earned 27 appearances in the Bulgarian B PFG, scoring four goals. In the Bulgarian Cup, he played four matches.

CSKA Sofia
In January 2011, he attracted the interest of the team of PFC CSKA Sofia.

Club statistics
As of 25 April 2019

References

External links
 Profile at Soccerway

1987 births
Living people
Bulgarian footballers
Bulgarian people of Turkish descent
First Professional Football League (Bulgaria) players
PFC Levski Sofia players
FC Dunav Ruse players
PFC Kaliakra Kavarna players
PFC CSKA Sofia players
FC Etar 1924 Veliko Tarnovo players
PFC Lokomotiv Plovdiv players
FC Vitosha Bistritsa players
PFC Minyor Pernik players
Footballers from Sofia
Association football midfielders